Seo Yeong-eun (Korean: 서영은; born May 18, 1943) is a South Korean writer.

Life
Born in Gangneung, Gangwon-do, Seo graduated from Gangneung Teacher Training School in 1961 and entered Konkuk University in 1963 to study English Language and Literature. However she left the university in 1965. In 1968, her short story, "Bridge" (Gyo) was accepted for publication by World of Thoughts (Sasanggye) and the following year, "I and 'I'" (Nawa 'na') was published in Monthly Literature (Wolgan munhak). She also worked as an editor for Literature and Thought (Munhaksasang) and reported for Korean Literature (Hanguk munhak), under the editorship of Lee Mungu. In 1983, she published a novella, The Distant Other, which won the Yi Sang Literary Award.

Works in translation
 A Walk in the Mountains

Works in Korean (partial)
Short story collections
 How To Cross a Desert (1977)
 A Festival of Flesh and Bones (Sal gwa ppyeoui chukje, 1978)
 Tagger, Tagger (1981)
 Golden Feather (Hwanggeum gitteol, 1984)
 The End of the River (Gangmurui kkeut, 1984)
 A Window with a Ladder (Sadariga noin chang, 1990)
 From Road to Oceanside (Gireseo badatkaro, 1992)
 From Dream Road to Dream Road (Kkumgireseo kkeumgillo, 1995).

Awards
 Yi Sang Literature Prize for her short story "The Distant Other" (1983)
 Yeonam Literary Prize for A Window with a Ladder (1990)

References

External links
Review of A Walk in the Mountains at KTLIT

1943 births
South Korean writers
Living people
People from Gangneung
Gangneung–Wonju National University alumni